Zhonghelu Church is a Protestant church located in Fushun, Liaoning Province, China. The current building was completed in 1998, after absorbing the Yingkelu Church. The church celebrated its 130th anniversary in 2012.

History
The church has the following history:
 Early Stage: 1882-1927 年
John Ross, a Presbyterian missionary stationed in Fengtian, started his mission in Fushun (1882). Later a Japanese church, ministered by Tamio Kishda at Minamidai, which after the end of the war would become the Yingkelu Church, the Qingyuanxian Church for the ethnic Koreans in China, and other churches were established.

 Separate Presbyterian & Assemblies of God Churches: 1928-1958
The Presbyterian Church of Fengtian approved the establishment of the Presbyterian Church of Fushun (1928).  An Assemblies of God church was also made in 1936.  In 1942, all Protestant churches were included in the Church of Christ in Manchuria. In 1945, the Fushun church was re-established under the Church of Christ in China.

 One Unified Presbyterian & Assemblies of God Church: 1959-1978
The Fushun City Three-Self Patriotic Movement Committee was established in  1958, and the Presbyterian and Assemblies of God churches were merged to become the Yingkelu Church in the following year. During the ten years of the Cultural Revolution, the church was persecuted and the believers held worship at home.

 Recovery and prosperity period: 1979-2012
Worship resumed at Yingkelu Church on 28 October 1980. Because the church building became dangerously old, a new building was built and consecrated at Zhonghelu Church on 17 July 1998, absorbing Yingkelu Church.  In 2012, the church celebrated the 130th anniversary of the Gospel reaching Fushun.

Address: Zhonghe Road at Yidao Street, Xinfu District, Fushun City, Liaoning Province.

See also
 Christianity in China
 Protestantism in China 
 John Ross
 Protestant churches in Northeast China:
Dalian Yuguang Street Church, Shenyang Dongguan Church, Changchun Christian Church, Harbin Nangang Christian Church, etc.

References

Buildings and structures in Fushun
Churches in Liaoning